Marek Netolický (born 20 January 2003) is a Slovak professional footballer who currently plays for Pohronie in the Fortuna Liga.

Club career

FK Pohronie
Netolický joined Pohronie's first team during the winter preparation of 2021–22, being an alumnus of the local youth teams.

Netolický made his Fortuna Liga debut in the premier round of the spring part of the season on 12 February 2022 at na Sihoti. Netolický came on in the 85th minute to replace former-Greek youth international Stelios Kokovas with the final score already set at 3–0, through two goals by Eduvie Ikoba and a first-half strike by Jakub Kadák. He was also on the bench for the subsequent home fixture against reigning champions Slovan Bratislava, where Pohronie was 3-0 up at half-time, to lose 3–4. Netolický did not make an appearance in the fixture.

References

External links
 
 
 Futbalnet profile 

2003 births
Living people
People from Nová Baňa
Sportspeople from the Banská Bystrica Region
Slovak footballers
Association football midfielders
FK Pohronie players
Slovak Super Liga players